The following table is a list of successful and unsuccessful Mars landers. As of 2022, 21 lander missions and 8 sub-landers (Rovers and Penetrators) attempted to land on Mars. Of 21 landers, the Curiosity rover, Perseverance rover, and Tianwen-1 are currently in operation on Mars.

Mars landers

§ - Spacecraft intended for Martian moons (Phobos and Deimos), †Entry Mass, ♦ Estimated, MOLA - Mars Orbiter Laser Altimeter

Future proposed Mars lander missions

See also
 Lists of spacecraft

References 

Exploration of Mars
Mars landers
Mars landers